Kamışlar is a neighborhood in the District of Bozdoğan, Aydın Province, Turkey. It was formerly a village of Bozdoğan, but in 2012 became a neighborhood of Bozdoğan, because Aydın became a metropolitan municipality. As of 2010 it had a population of 503 people.

References

Villages in Bozdoğan District